The Sixth Wholesale Power Market Generating Company JSC (OGK-6) was a Russian power generation company formed by merger of six generation companies. In 2006, the following power plants were merged into single company:

Novocherkassk GRES – 2,112 MW,
Kirishi GRES – 2,100 MW
Ryazan GRES – 2,650 MW
Krasnoyarsk-2 GRES - 1,250 MW
Cherepovets GRES - 1,050 MW
GRES-24–310 MW (at Novomichurinsk; merged with Ryazan GRES in November 2008)

The installed capacity of all six thermal power plants was about 9,052 MW which made OGK-6 the fourth largest power company by installed capacity in Russia. The total installed heat of OGK-6 plants amounted to 2,704 Gcal/h. The power output of the OGK-6 power plants in 2007 was around 32.065 TWh.

OGK-6 shares were traded on MICEX and RTS.

In April 2010, it was announced that Gazprom, the major shareholder of OGK-2 and OGK-6, will merger OGK-6 into OGK-2 to create a single company with 10 power stations and a capacity of 17,750 MW. The merger was completed by 1 November 2011.

References

Electric power companies of Russia
Companies based in Rostov-on-Don
Gazprom subsidiaries
Defunct companies of Russia
Energy companies established in 2005
Energy companies disestablished in 2011